Compsoctena ochrastis is a moth in the family Eriocottidae. It was described by Edward Meyrick in 1937. It is found in South Africa.

References

Endemic moths of South Africa
Moths described in 1937
Compsoctena
Lepidoptera of South Africa